Peter Charles Ravai (born 25 March 2003) is a footballer who plays as a defender and midfielder for the youth academy of Maidstone United. Born in Scotland, he is a Fiji youth international and has been called up to represent Fiji internationally.

Career

Club career

As a youth player, Ravai joined the youth academy of German Bundesliga side HSV. After that, he joined the youth academy of Maidstone United in the English fifth tier.

International career

Ravai is eligible to represent Scotland having been born there and Fiji through his parents.

References

External links

 Peter Ravai at playmakerstats.com 

2003 births
Association football defenders
Association football midfielders 
Expatriate footballers in England
Expatriate footballers in Germany
Fijian expatriate footballers
Fijian footballers
Living people